David Lawrence Fridmann is an American record producer and musician.

Career
From 1990 onwards he co-produced most releases by Mercury Rev and The Flaming Lips. Other bands he has worked with include Weezer, Saxon Shore, Neon Indian, Wolf Gang, Ammonia, Ed Harcourt, Sparklehorse, Creeper Lagoon, Café Tacuba, Creaming Jesus, Elf Power, Mogwai, Thursday, Longwave, Mass of the Fermenting Dregs, The Delgados, Low, Phantom Planet, Gemma Hayes, Ava Luna, Goldrush, Tapes 'n Tapes, Hopewell, Black Moth Super Rainbow, Number Girl, Jed Davis, Zazen Boys, Sleater-Kinney and Clap Your Hands Say Yeah. He has recently worked on new recordings with MGMT, Neil Finn, The Cribs, OK Go, Tame Impala, Lord Huron, Baroness, Spoon, Interpol, and I Dont Know How But They Found Me

As a musician, Fridmann was the bassist and a founding member of Mercury Rev.  He gave up his role as a touring member of the band in 1993 to concentrate on producing other artists.  In 2001, Fridmann was included on MOJO's 100 Sonic Visionaries list and was described as "the Phil Spector of the Alt-Rock era".  In 2007, he received a Grammy for The Flaming Lips' At War With The Mystics at the 49th Annual Grammy Awards (Best Engineered Album, Non-Classical).  In 2010, three Fridmann-produced albums were listed on the Rolling Stone 100 Best Albums of The Decade: MGMT's Oracular Spectacular, The Flaming Lips' Yoshimi Battles The Pink Robots, and Sleater-Kinney's The Woods.

Fridmann often brings a distinctive, expansive, open sound to the albums he produces, which has much in common with that used by Mercury Rev.

Fridmann is an occasional faculty member of SUNY Fredonia, teaching sound recording techniques in the Fredonia School of Music.

In 2017, Fridmann became the director for the Western New York Alumni Drum and Bugle Corps, where he plays the bass drum. The group disbanded in 2022.

Discography

As producer

References

External links 
 Dave Fridmann
 Tarbox Road Studios

Living people
Record producers from New York (state)
Year of birth missing (living people)
American audio engineers
American rock bass guitarists
American male bass guitarists
Grammy Award winners
Mercury Rev members
The Flaming Lips
Musicians from Buffalo, New York
State University of New York at Fredonia alumni
Businesspeople from Buffalo, New York
20th-century American musicians
Guitarists from New York (state)
American male guitarists